James Kirkcaldie (18 April 1875 – 16 August 1931) was a New Zealand cricketer. He played in one first-class match for Wellington in 1903/04.

See also
 List of Wellington representative cricketers

References

External links
 

1875 births
1931 deaths
New Zealand cricketers
Wellington cricketers
People from Enfield, London